The Hito Music Awards is an annual Mandopop music awards show, presented by Hit FM in Taiwan. Unlike the Golden Melody Awards, which are awarded on the basis of votes by members of the jury, the Hito Music Awards are determined by a poll of the public and fans, who can vote through the official website.

American singer-songwriter Taylor Swift is one of the most celebrated western artists at the awards ceremony, having won six awards as of 2021.

Categories 
 Top Ten Chinese Songs of the Year
 Western Songs of the Year
 Best Lyricist
 Best Composer
 Best Arranger
 Best Producer
 Best Newcomer
 Best TV Theme Song
 Best Movie Theme Song
 Best Duet Song
 Best Female Singer
 Best Male Singer
 Best Orchestra

References

External links 
 		
	

Awards established in 2003
Chinese music awards
Recurring events established in 2003
2003 establishments in Taiwan